This is a complete list of Scottish Statutory Instruments in 2008.

1-100

 The Individual Learning Account (Scotland) Amendment Regulations 2008 (S.S.I. 2008 No. 1)
 The Public Service Vehicles (Traffic Regulation Conditions) Amendment (Scotland) Regulations 2008 (S.S.I. 2008 No. 2)
 The Local Authorities' Traffic Orders (Procedure) (Scotland) Amendment Regulations 2008 (S.S.I. 2008 No. 3)
 The School Crossing Patrol Sign (Scotland) Regulations 2008 (S.S.I. 2008 No. 4)
 The Bankruptcy Fees (Scotland) Amendment Regulations 2008 (S.S.I. 2008 No. 5)
 The Police Act 1997 (Criminal Records) (Scotland) Amendment Regulations 2008 (S.S.I. 2008 No. 6)
 The Criminal Procedure (Scotland) Act 1995 Compensation Offer (Maximum Amount) Order 2008 (S.S.I. 2008 No. 7)
 The Discontinuance of Legalised Police Cells (Scotland) Rules 2008 (S.S.I. 2008 No. 8)
 Act of Sederunt (Summary Applications, Statutory Applications and Appeals etc. Rules) Amendment (Licensing (Scotland) Act 2005) 2008 (S.S.I. 2008 No. 9)
 The Shrimp Fishing Nets (Scotland) Amendment Order 2008 (S.S.I. 2008 No. 10)
 The Bluetongue (Scotland) Order 2008 (S.S.I. 2008 No. 11)
 The Condensed Milk and Dried Milk (Scotland) Amendment Regulations 2008 (S.S.I. 2008 No. 12)
 The National Assistance (Assessment of Resources) Amendment (Scotland) Regulations 2008 (S.S.I. 2008 No. 13)
 The National Assistance (Sums for Personal Requirements) (Scotland) Regulations 2008 (S.S.I. 2008 No. 14)
 The Transport (Scotland) Act 2005 (Commencement No. 4) Order 2008 (S.S.I. 2008 No. 15 (C. 1))
 The Scottish Road Works Register (Prescribed Fees and Amounts) Regulations 2008 (S.S.I. 2008 No. 16)
 The Conservation (Natural Habitats, &c.) Amendment (Scotland) Regulations 2008 (S.S.I. 2008 No. 17)
 The A92/A972 Trunk Road (Cadham Road and Car Wash Facility) (Prohibition of Specified Turns) Order 2008 (S.S.I. 2008 No. 18)
 The Annual Close Time (Permitted Periods of Fishing) (River Dee (Aberdeenshire) Salmon Fishery District) Order 2008 (S.S.I. 2008 No. 19)
 The Police Grant (Variation) (Scotland) Order 2008 (S.S.I. 2008 No. 20)
 The Management of Offenders etc. (Scotland) Act 2005 (Commencement No. 4) Order 2008 (S.S.I. 2008 No. 21 (C. 2))
 The Abolition of Bridge Tolls (Scotland) Act 2008 (Commencement) Order 2008 (S.S.I. 2008 No. 22 (C. 3))
 The South West Unit Trunk Roads Area (Temporary Prohibitions of Traffic, Temporary Prohibitions of  Overtaking and Temporary Speed Restrictions) Order 2008 (S.S.I. 2008 No. 23)
 The South East Unit Trunk Roads Area (Temporary Prohibitions of Traffic, Temporary Prohibitions of Overtaking and Temporary Speed Restrictions) Order 2008 (S.S.I. 2008 No. 24)
 The North West Unit Trunk Roads Area (Temporary Prohibitions of Traffic, Temporary Prohibitions of Overtaking and Temporary Speed Restrictions) Order 2008 (S.S.I. 2008 No. 25)
 The North East Unit Trunk Roads Area (Temporary Prohibitions of Traffic, Temporary Prohibitions of Overtaking and Temporary Speed Restrictions) Order 2008 (S.S.I. 2008 No. 26)
 The National Health Service (Charges for Drugs and Appliances) (Scotland) Regulations 2008 (S.S.I. 2008 No. 27)
 The Housing (Scotland) Act 2001 (Alteration of Housing Finance Arrangements) Order 2008 (S.S.I. 2008 No. 28)
 The Sea Fish (Prohibited Methods of Fishing) (Firth of Clyde) Order 2008 (S.S.I. 2008 No. 29)
 The Management of Offenders etc. (Scotland) Act 2005 (Members' Remuneration and Supplementary Provisions) Order 2008 (S.S.I. 2008 No. 30)
 The Justice of the Peace Courts (Sheriffdom of Lothian and Borders) etc. Order 2008 (S.S.I. 2008 No. 31)
 The Non-Domestic Rate (Scotland) Order 2008 (S.S.I. 2008 No. 32)
 The Housing Revenue Account General Fund Contribution Limits (Scotland) Order 2008 (S.S.I. 2008 No. 34)
 The Discontinuance of Legalised Police Cells (Scotland) Revocation Rules 2008 (S.S.I. 2008 No. 35)
 The Home Detention Curfew Licence (Prescribed Standard Conditions) (Scotland) Order 2008 (S.S.I. 2008 No. 36)
 The Emergency Workers (Scotland) Act 2005 (Modification) Order 2008 (S.S.I. 2008 No. 37)
 The Home Energy Efficiency Scheme (Scotland) Amendment Regulations 2008 (S.S.I. 2008 No. 38)
 Act of Sederunt (Rules of the Court of Session Amendment) (Fees of Solicitors) 2008 (S.S.I. 2008 No. 39)
 Act of Sederunt (Fees of Solicitors in the Sheriff Court) (Amendment) 2008 (S.S.I. 2008 No. 40)
 Act of Sederunt (Summary Applications, Statutory Applications and Appeals etc. Rules) Amendment (Registration Appeals) 2008 (S.S.I. 2008 No. 41)
 The Criminal Proceedings etc. (Reform) (Scotland) Act 2007 (Commencement No. 3 and Savings) Order 2008 (S.S.I. 2008 No. 42 (C. 4))
 The Road Works (Inspection Fees) (Scotland) Amendment Regulations 2008 (S.S.I. 2008 No. 43)
 The Water and Sewerage Services Undertaking (Lending by the Scottish Ministers) Order 2008 (S.S.I. 2008 No. 44)
 The Bankruptcy and Diligence etc. (Scotland) Act 2007 (Commencement No. 2 and Saving) Order 2008 (S.S.I. 2008 No. 45 (C. 5))
 The Police Grant (Scotland) Order 2008 (S.S.I. 2008 No. 46)
 The Advice and Assistance (Scotland) Amendment Regulations 2008 (S.S.I. 2008 No. 47)
 The Civil Legal Aid (Scotland) Amendment Regulations 2008 (S.S.I. 2008 No. 48)
 The Adult Support and Protection (Scotland) Act 2007 (Commencement No. 2 and Transitional Provisions) Order 2008 (S.S.I. 2008 No. 49 (C. 6))
 The Adult Support and Protection (Scotland) Act 2007 (Adults with Incapacity) (Consequential Provisions) Order 2008 (S.S.I. 2008 No. 50)
 The Adults with Incapacity (Accounts and Funds) (Scotland) Regulations 2008 (S.S.I. 2008 No. 51)
 The Adults with Incapacity (Public Guardian’s Fees) (Scotland) Regulations 2008 (S.S.I. 2008 No. 52)
 The Adults with Incapacity (Recall of Guardians' Powers) (Scotland) Amendment Regulations 2008 (S.S.I. 2008 No. 53)
 The Water Environment (Diffuse Pollution) (Scotland) Regulations 2008 (S.S.I. 2008 No. 54)
 The Adults with Incapacity (Reports in Relation to Guardianship and Intervention Orders) (Scotland) Amendment Regulations 2008 (S.S.I. 2008 No. 55)
 The Adults with Incapacity (Certificates in Relation to Powers of Attorney) (Scotland) Regulations 2008 (S.S.I. 2008 No. 56)
 The Vulnerable Witnesses (Scotland) Act 2004 (Commencement No. 7, Savings and Transitional Provisions) Order 2008 (S.S.I. 2008 No. 57 (C. 7))
 The Crofting Counties Agricultural Grants (Scotland) Amendment Scheme 2008 (S.S.I. 2008 No. 58)
 The Charities References in Documents (Scotland) Amendment Regulations 2008 (S.S.I. 2008 No. 59)
 The National Health Service (Clinical Negligence and Other Risks Indemnity Scheme) (Scotland) Amendment Regulations 2008 (S.S.I. 2008 No. 60)
 Act of Adjournal (Criminal Procedure Rules Amendment) (Criminal Proceedings etc. (Reform) (Scotland) Act 2007) 2008 (S.S.I. 2008 No. 61)
 Act of Adjournal (Criminal Procedure Rules Amendment No. 2) (Miscellaneous) 2008 (S.S.I. 2008 No. 62)
 The Food Protection (Emergency Prohibitions) (Radioactivity in Sheep) Partial Revocation (Scotland) Order 2008 (S.S.I. 2008 No. 63)
 The Agricultural Processing, Marketing and Co-operation Grants (Scotland) Regulations 2008 (S.S.I. 2008 No. 64)
 The Pesticides (Maximum Residue Levels in Crops, Food and Feeding Stuffs) (Scotland) Amendment Regulations 2008 (S.S.I. 2008 No. 65)
 The Leader Grants (Scotland) Regulations 2008 (S.S.I. 2008 No. 66)
 The A77 Trunk Road (Bogend to Dutchhouse) (50 mph Speed Limit) Order 2008 (S.S.I. 2008 No. 67)
 The North East Unit Trunk Roads Area (Temporary Prohibitions of Traffic, Temporary Prohibitions of Overtaking and Temporary Speed Restrictions) (No. 2) Order 2008 (S.S.I. 2008 No. 68)
 The North West Unit Trunk Roads Area (Temporary Prohibitions of Traffic, Temporary Prohibitions of Overtaking and Temporary Speed Restrictions) (No.2) Order 2008 (S.S.I. 2008 No. 69)
 The South East Unit Trunk Roads Area (Temporary Prohibitions of Traffic, Temporary Prohibitions of Overtaking and Temporary Speed Restrictions) (No.2) Order 2008 (S.S.I. 2008 No. 70)
 The South West Unit Trunk Roads Area (Temporary Prohibitions of Traffic, Temporary Prohibitions of Overtaking and Temporary Speed Restrictions) (No.2) Order 2008 (S.S.I. 2008 No. 71)
 Act of Sederunt (Fees of Solicitors in the Sheriff Court) (Amendment No. 2) 2008 (S.S.I. 2008 No. 72)
 The M80/A80 Trunk Road (Temporary Width Restriction of Traffic) Order 2008 (S.S.I. 2008 No. 73)
 The Town and Country Planning (General Permitted Development) (Avian Influenza) (Scotland) Amendment Order 2008 (S.S.I. 2008 No. 74)
 The Intensive Support and Monitoring (Scotland) Regulations 2008 (S.S.I. 2008 No. 75)
 The Housing (Scotland) Act 2006 (Prescribed Documents) Regulations 2008 (S.S.I. 2008 No. 76)
 The Quality Meat Scotland Order 2008 (S.S.I. 2008 No. 77)
 The Community Care (Personal Care and Nursing Care) (Scotland) Amendment Regulations 2008 (S.S.I. 2008 No. 78)
 The Bankruptcy Fees (Scotland) Amendment (No. 2) Regulations 2008 (S.S.I. 2008 No. 79)
 The Valuation and Rating (Exempted Classes) (Scotland) Order 2008 (S.S.I. 2008 No. 80)
 The Bankruptcy (Scotland) Act 1985 (Low Income, Low Asset Debtors etc.) Regulations 2008 (S.S.I. 2008 No. 81)
 The Bankruptcy (Scotland) Regulations 2008 (S.S.I. 2008 No. 82)
 The Non-Domestic Rating (Unoccupied Property) (Scotland) Amendment Regulations 2008 (S.S.I. 2008 No. 83)
 The Non-Domestic Rating (Telecommunications and Canals) (Scotland) Amendment Order 2008 (S.S.I. 2008 No. 84)
 The Non-Domestic Rates (Levying) (Scotland) Regulations 2008 (S.S.I. 2008 No. 85)
 The Pollution Prevention and Control (Designation of Batteries Directive) (Scotland) Order 2008 (S.S.I. 2008 No. 86)
 The Rice Products from the United States of America (Restriction on First Placing on the Market) (Scotland) Regulations 2008 (S.S.I. 2008 No. 87)
 The Road Works (Scottish Road Works Register, Notices, Directions and Designations) (Scotland) Regulations 2008 (S.S.I. 2008 No. 88)
 The Road Works (Settlement of Disputes and Appeals against Directions) (Scotland) Regulations 2008 (S.S.I. 2008 No. 89)
 The Transport (Scotland) Act 2005 (Commencement No. 4) Amendment Order 2008 (S.S.I. 2008 No. 90 (C. 8))
 The A9 Trunk Road (Scrabster) (Prohibition of Waiting) Order 2008 (S.S.I. 2008 No. 91)
 The National Health Service (Superannuation Scheme, Injury Benefits, Additional Voluntary Contributions and Compensation for Premature Retirement) (Scotland) Amendment Regulations 2008 (S.S.I. 2008 No. 92)
 The Justice of the Peace Courts (Sheriffdom of Grampian, Highland and Islands) Order 2008 (S.S.I. 2008 No. 93)
 The Public Contracts and Utilities Contracts (Scotland) Amendment Regulations 2008 (S.S.I. 2008 No. 94)
 The M9/A9 Trunk Road (Temporary Width Restriction of Traffic) Order 2008 (S.S.I. 2008 No. 95)
 The Personal Injuries (NHS Charges) (Amounts) (Scotland) Amendment Regulations 2008 (S.S.I. 2008 No. 96)
 The Meat Products (Scotland) Amendment Regulations 2008 (S.S.I. 2008 No. 97)
 The Meat (Official Controls Charges) (Scotland) Regulations 2008 (S.S.I. 2008 No. 98)
 The Horses (Zootechnical Standards) (Scotland) Regulations 2008 (S.S.I. 2008 No. 99)
 The Rural Development Contracts (Rural Priorities) (Scotland) Regulations 2008 (S.S.I. 2008 No. 100)

101-200

 The Aquaculture and Fisheries (Scotland) Act 2007 (Fixed Penalty Notices) Order 2008 (S.S.I. 2008 No. 101)
 The Sea Fishing (Control Procedures for Herring, Mackerel and Horse Mackerel) (Scotland) Order 2008 (S.S.I. 2008 No. 102)
 The Enforcement of Fines (Seizure and Disposal of Vehicles) (Scotland) Regulations 2008 (S.S.I. 2008 No. 103)
 The Enforcement of Fines (Diligence) (Scotland) Regulations 2008 (S.S.I. 2008 No. 104)
 The National Health Service (Charges for Drugs and Appliances) (Scotland) Amendment Regulations 2008 (S.S.I. 2008 No. 105)
 The National Health Service (Optical Charges and Payments) (Scotland) Amendment Regulations 2008 (S.S.I. 2008 No. 106)
 The Budget (Scotland) Act 2007 Amendment Order 2008 (S.S.I. 2008 No. 107)
 The Criminal Procedure (Scotland) Act 1995 Fixed Penalty Order 2008 (S.S.I. 2008 No. 108)
 The Criminal Proceedings etc. (Reform) (Scotland) Act 2007 (Supplemental Provisions) Order 2008 (S.S.I. 2008 No. 109)
 The Trunk Roads (Route A84) (Callander) (Prohibition of Waiting and Loading) (Variation) Order 2008 (S.S.I. 2008 No. 110)
 Act of Sederunt (Summary Applications, Statutory Applications and Appeals etc. Rules) Amendment (Adult Support and Protection (Scotland) Act 2007) 2008 (S.S.I. 2008 No. 111)
 The Scottish Commission for Human Rights Act 2006 (Commencement No. 2) Order 2008 (S.S.I. 2008 No. 112 (C. 9))
 The A90 Trunk Road (Oatyhill) (Temporary Prohibition of Specified Turns) Order 2008 (S.S.I. 2008 No. 113)
 The A96 Trunk Road (West Road, Elgin) (Prohibition of Waiting) Order 2008 (S.S.I. 2008 No. 114)
 The Bankruptcy and Diligence etc. (Scotland) Act 2007 (Commencement No. 3, Savings and Transitionals) Order 2008 (S.S.I. 2008 No. 115 (C. 10))
 The Adult Support and Protection (Scotland) Act 2007 (Commencement No. 2 and Transitional Provisions) Amendment Order 2008 (S.S.I. 2008 No. 116 (C. 11))
 The Police (Special Constables) (Scotland) Regulations 2008 (S.S.I. 2008 No. 117)
 Act of Sederunt (Fees of Shorthand Writers in the Sheriff Court) (Amendment) 2008 (S.S.I. 2008 No. 118)
 Act of Sederunt (Sheriff Court Bankruptcy Rules) 2008 (S.S.I. 2008 No. 119)
 Act of Sederunt (Rules of the Court of Session Amendment No. 2) (Fees of Shorthand Writers) 2008 (S.S.I. 2008 No. 120)
 Act of Sederunt (Sheriff Court Rules Amendment) (Diligence) 2008 (S.S.I. 2008 No. 121)
 Act of Sederunt (Rules of the Court of Session Amendment No. 3) (Bankruptcy and Diligence etc. (Scotland) Act 2007) 2008 (S.S.I. 2008 No. 122)
 Act of Sederunt (Rules of the Court of Session Amendment No. 4) (Miscellaneous) 2008 (S.S.I. 2008 No. 123)
 The Home Detention Curfew Licence (Prescribed Standard Conditions) (Scotland) Revocation Order 2008 (S.S.I. 2008 No. 124)
 The Home Detention Curfew Licence (Prescribed Standard Conditions) (Scotland) (No. 2) Order 2008 (S.S.I. 2008 No. 125)
 The Home Detention Curfew Licence (Amendment of Specified Days) (Scotland) Order 2008 (S.S.I. 2008 No. 126)
 The Plastic Materials and Articles in Contact with Food (Scotland) Regulations 2008 (S.S.I. 2008 No. 127)
 The Sexual Offences Act 2003 (Prescribed Police Stations) (Scotland) Regulations 2008 (S.S.I. 2008 No. 128)
 The Eggs and Chicks (Scotland) Regulations 2008 (S.S.I. 2008 No. 129)
 The Adoption and Children (Scotland) Act 2007 (Commencement No. 1) Order 2008 (S.S.I. 2008 No. 130 (C. 12))
 The Official Statistics (Scotland) Order 2008 (S.S.I. 2008 No. 131)
 The Renewables Obligation (Scotland) Amendment Order 2008 (S.S.I. 2008 No. 132)
 The Housing Support Grant (Scotland) Order 2008 (S.S.I. 2008 No. 133)
 The A92 Trunk Road (B969 Western Avenue Junction, Glenrothes) (Temporary Prohibition of Specified Turns) Order 2008 (S.S.I. 2008 No. 134)
 The Forestry Challenge Funds (Scotland) Regulations 2008 (S.S.I. 2008 No. 135)
 The Local Government Finance (Scotland) Amendment Order 2008 (S.S.I. 2008 No. 136)
 The Advice and Assistance (Financial Conditions) (Scotland) Regulations 2008 (S.S.I. 2008 No. 137)
 The Civil Legal Aid (Financial Conditions) (Scotland) Regulations 2008 (S.S.I. 2008 No. 138)
 The South West Unit Trunk Roads Area (Temporary Prohibitions of Traffic, Temporary Prohibitions of Overtaking and Temporary Speed Restrictions) (No.3) Order 2008 (S.S.I. 2008 No. 139)
 The South East Unit Trunk Roads Area (Temporary Prohibitions of Traffic, Temporary Prohibitions of Overtaking and Temporary Speed Restrictions) (No.3) Order 2008 (S.S.I. 2008 No. 140)
 The North West Unit Trunk Roads Area (Temporary Prohibitions of Traffic, Temporary Prohibitions of Overtaking and Temporary Speed Restrictions) (No. 3) Order 2008 (S.S.I. 2008 No. 141)
 The North East Unit Trunk Roads Area (Temporary Prohibitions of Traffic, Temporary Prohibitions of Overtaking and Temporary Speed Restrictions) (No. 3) Order 2008 (S.S.I. 2008 No. 142)
 The Protected Trust Deeds (Scotland) Regulations 2008 (S.S.I. 2008 No. 143)
 The Companies Act 2006 (Scottish public sector companies to be audited by the Auditor General for Scotland) Order 2008 (S.S.I. 2008 No. 144)
 The A835 Trunk Road (Tore to Maryburgh Cycle Track) (Redetermination of Means of Exercise of Public Right of Passage) Order 2008 (S.S.I. 2008 No. 145)
 The M77/A77 Trunk Road (Bellfield to Dutchhouse) (Temporary Prohibition of Specified Turns) Order 2008 (S.S.I. 2008 No. 146)
 The National Health Service (Travelling Expenses and Remission of Charges) (Scotland) Amendment Regulations 2008 (S.S.I. 2008 No. 147)
 The Specified Products from China (Restriction on First Placing on the Market) (Scotland) Regulations 2008 (S.S.I. 2008 No. 148) - Amended by regulation 2 of SSI 2012/3
 The Management of Offenders etc. (Scotland) Act 2005 (Commencement No. 5) Order 2008 (S.S.I. 2008 No. 149 (C. 13))
 The Tribunals, Courts and Enforcement Act 2007 (Commencement) (Scotland) Order 2008 (S.S.I. 2008 No. 150 (C. 14))
 The Sea Fishing (Enforcement of Community Quota and Third Country Fishing Measures and Restriction on Days at Sea) (Scotland) Order 2008 (S.S.I. 2008 No. 151)
 The Serious Crime Act 2007 (Commencement No. 1) (Scotland) Order 2008 (S.S.I. 2008 No. 152 (C. 15))
 The Plant Health Fees (Scotland) Regulations 2008 (S.S.I. 2008 No. 153)
 The Smoke Control Areas (Authorised Fuels) (Scotland) Regulations 2008 (S.S.I. 2008 No. 154)
 The Animals and Animal Products (Import and Export) (Scotland) Amendment Regulations 2008 (S.S.I. 2008 No. 155)
 The Sea Fishing (Control Procedures for Herring, Mackerel and Horse Mackerel) (Scotland) Amendment Order 2008 (S.S.I. 2008 No. 156)
 The Smoke Control Areas (Exempt Fireplaces) (Scotland) Order 2008 (S.S.I. 2008 No. 157)
 The Products of Animal Origin (Disease Control) (Scotland) Order 2008 (S.S.I. 2008 No. 158)
 The Rural Development Contracts (Land Managers Options) (Scotland) Regulations 2008 (S.S.I. 2008 No. 159)
 The Firefighters' Pension Scheme (Scotland) Order 2007 Amendment Order 2008 (S.S.I. 2008 No. 160)
 The Firefighters' Pension Scheme Amendment (Scotland) Order 2008 (S.S.I. 2008 No. 161)
 The Land Managers Skills Development Grants (Scotland) Regulations 2008 (S.S.I. 2008 No. 162)
 The Designation of Institutions of Higher Education (The Scottish Agricultural College) (Scotland) Order 2008 (S.S.I. 2008 No. 163)
 The Planning etc. (Scotland) Act 2006 (Commencement No. 3) Order 2008 (S.S.I. 2008 No. 164 (C. 16))
 The Planning etc. (Scotland) Act 2006 (Development Planning) (Saving Provisions) Order 2008 (S.S.I. 2008 No. 165)
 The Transmissible Spongiform Encephalopathies (Scotland) Amendment Regulations 2008 (S.S.I. 2008 No. 166)
 The A720 Trunk Road (Edinburgh City Bypass) (Temporary Prohibition of Traffic, Temporary Prohibition of Overtaking and Temporary Speed Restriction) Order 2008 (S.S.I. 2008 No. 167)
 The Lyon Court and Office Fees (Variation) (No. 2) Order 2008 (S.S.I. 2008 No. 168)
 The A82 Trunk Road (Glencoe Village) (40 mph Speed Limit) Order 2008 (S.S.I. 2008 No. 169)
 The Bathing Waters (Scotland) Regulations 2008 (S.S.I. 2008 No. 170)
 The Schools (Health Promotion and Nutrition) (Scotland) Act 2007 (Commencement No. 2) Order 2008 (S.S.I. 2008 No. 171 (C. 17))
 The South West Unit Trunk Roads Area (Temporary Prohibitions of Traffic, Temporary Prohibitions of Overtaking and Temporary Speed Restrictions) (No.4) Order 2008 (S.S.I. 2008 No. 172)
 The South East Unit Trunk Roads Area (Temporary Prohibitions of Traffic, Temporary Prohibitions of Overtaking and Temporary Speed Restrictions) (No.4) Order 2008 (S.S.I. 2008 No. 173)
 The North East Unit Trunk Roads Area (Temporary Prohibitions of Traffic, Temporary Prohibitions of Overtaking and Temporary Speed Restrictions) (No.4) Order 2008 (S.S.I. 2008 No. 174)
 The North West Unit Trunk Roads Area (Temporary Prohibitions of Traffic, Temporary Prohibitions of Overtaking and Temporary Speed Restrictions) (No.4) Order 2008 (S.S.I. 2008 No. 175)
 The Guar Gum (Restriction on First Placing on the Market) (Scotland) Regulations 2008 (S.S.I. 2008 No. 176)
 The Designation of Institutions of Higher Education (The Scottish Agricultural College) (Scotland) (No. 2) Order 2008 (S.S.I. 2008 No. 177)
 The Central Institutions (Recognition) (Scotland) Revocation Regulations 2008 (S.S.I. 2008 No. 178)
 The Justice of the Peace Courts (Sheriffdom of Grampian, Highland and Islands) Amendment Order 2008 (S.S.I. 2008 No. 179)
 The Food Labelling (Declaration of Allergens) (Scotland) Regulations 2008 (S.S.I. 2008 No. 180)
 The Mental Health (Cross-border Visits) (Scotland) Regulations 2008 (S.S.I. 2008 No. 181)
 The Caledonian Maritime Assets Limited (Largs) Harbour Revision Order 2008 (S.S.I. 2008 No. 182)
 The A92/A972 Trunk Road (Kingsway East, Dundee) (Temporary Prohibition of Specified Turns) Order 2008 (S.S.I. 2008 No. 183)
 The Common Agricultural Policy (Single Farm Payment and Support Schemes and Cross-Compliance) (Scotland) Amendment Regulations 2008 (S.S.I. 2008 No. 184)
 The Victim Notification Scheme (Scotland) Order 2008 (S.S.I. 2008 No. 185)
 The Public Transport Users' Committee for Scotland Amendment Order 2008 (S.S.I. 2008 No. 186)
 The Mobility and Access Committee for Scotland Revocation Regulations 2008 (S.S.I. 2008 No. 187)
 The Dumfries and Galloway Council (Port William) Harbour Empowerment Order 2008 (S.S.I. 2008 No. 188)
 The Dumfries and Galloway Council (Isle of Whithorn) Harbour Empowerment Order 2008 (S.S.I. 2008 No. 189)
 The Dumfries and Galloway Council (Garlieston) Harbour Empowerment Order 2008 (S.S.I. 2008 No. 190)
 The Planning etc. (Scotland) Act 2006 (Commencement No. 4) Order 2008 (S.S.I. 2008 No. 191 (C. 18))
 The Criminal Proceedings etc. (Reform) (Scotland) Act 2007 (Commencement No. 4) Order 2008 (S.S.I. 2008 No. 192 (C. 19))
 The Nature Conservation (Scotland) Act 2004 (Commencement No. 3) Order 2008 (S.S.I. 2008 No. 193 (C. 20))
 The Licensing (Transitional Provisions) (Scotland) Order 2008 (S.S.I. 2008 No. 194)
 The Strategic Development Planning Authority Designation (No. 1) (Scotland) Order 2008 (S.S.I. 2008 No. 195)
 The Strategic Development Planning Authority Designation (No. 2) (Scotland) Order 2008 (S.S.I. 2008 No. 196)
 The Strategic Development Planning Authority Designation (No. 3) (Scotland) Order 2008 (S.S.I. 2008 No. 197)
 The Strategic Development Planning Authority Designation (No. 4) (Scotland) Order 2008 (S.S.I. 2008 No. 198)
 The Transport and Works (Scotland) Act 2007 (Access to Land on Application) Order 2008 (S.S.I. 2008 No. 199)
 The Transport and Works (Scotland) Act 2007 (Access to Land by the Scottish Ministers) Order 2008 (S.S.I. 2008 No. 200)

201-300

 The Feed (Hygiene and Enforcement) (Scotland) Amendment Regulations 2008 (S.S.I. 2008 No. 201)
 The National Scenic Areas (Scotland) Regulations 2008 (S.S.I. 2008 No. 202)
 The Town and Country Planning (General Permitted Development) (Scotland) Amendment Order 2008 (S.S.I. 2008 No. 203)
 The Individual Learning Account (Scotland) Amendment (No. 2) Regulations 2008 (S.S.I. 2008 No. 204)
 The Education (Student Loans) (Scotland) Amendment Regulations 2008 (S.S.I. 2008 No. 205)
 The Education (Means Testing) (Scotland) Amendment Regulations 2008 (S.S.I. 2008 No. 206)
 The South West Unit Trunk Roads Area (Temporary Prohibitions of Traffic, Temporary Prohibitions of Overtaking and Temporary Speed Restrictions) (No.5) Order 2008 (S.S.I. 2008 No. 207)
 The South East Unit Trunk Roads Area (Temporary Prohibitions of Traffic, Temporary Prohibitions of Overtaking and Temporary Speed Restrictions) (No.5) Order 2008 (S.S.I. 2008 No. 208)
 The North West Unit Trunk Roads Area (Temporary Prohibitions of Traffic, Temporary Prohibitions of Overtaking and Temporary Speed Restrictions) (No.5) Order 2008 (S.S.I. 2008 No. 209)
 The North East Unit Trunk Roads Area (Temporary Prohibitions of Traffic, Temporary Prohibitions of Overtaking and Temporary Speed Restrictions) (No.5) Order 2008 (S.S.I. 2008 No. 210)
 The A76 Trunk Road (Newbridge Drive, Dumfries to Newbridge Village) (Redetermination of Means of Exercise of Public Right of Passage) Order 2008 (S.S.I. 2008 No. 211)
 The Academic Awards and Distinctions (UHI Millennium Institute) (Scotland) Order of Council 2008 (S.S.I. 2008 No. 212)
 The Education (Assisted Places) (Scotland) Amendment Regulations 2008 (S.S.I. 2008 No. 213)
 The St Mary’s Music School (Aided Places) (Scotland) Amendment Regulations 2008 (S.S.I. 2008 No. 214)
 The Feeding Stuffs (Scotland) Amendment Regulations 2008 (S.S.I. 2008 No. 215)
 The Spreadable Fats, Milk and Milk Products (Scotland) Regulations 2008 (S.S.I. 2008 No. 216)
 The Title Conditions (Scotland) Act 2003 (Conservation Bodies) Amendment Order 2008 (S.S.I. 2008 No. 217)
 The Official Feed and Food Controls (Scotland) Amendment Regulations 2008 (S.S.I. 2008 No. 218)
 The Diseases of Animals (Approved Disinfectants) (Scotland) Order 2008 (S.S.I. 2008 No. 219)
 The Academic Awards and Distinctions (Additional Powers of the University of Aberdeen) Order of Council 2008 (S.S.I. 2008 No. 220)
 The Register of Sites of Special Scientific Interest (Scotland) Regulations 2008 (S.S.I. 2008 No. 221)
 The Registration of Fish Farming and Shellfish Farming Businesses Amendment (Scotland) Order 2008 (S.S.I. 2008 No. 222)
 Act of Sederunt (Sheriff Court Rules) (Miscellaneous Amendments) 2008 (S.S.I. 2008 No. 223)
 The National Health Service Pension Scheme (Scotland) Regulations 2008 (S.S.I. 2008 No. 224)
 The National Health Service Superannuation Scheme (Additional Voluntary Contributions, Injury Benefits and Compensation for Premature Retirement) (Scotland) Amendment Regulations 2008 (S.S.I. 2008 No. 225)
 The National Health Service Superannuation Scheme (Scotland) Amendment Regulations 2008 (S.S.I. 2008 No. 226)
 The Teachers' Superannuation (Scotland) Amendment Regulations 2008 (S.S.I. 2008 No. 227)
 The Local Government Pension Scheme (Administration) (Scotland) Regulations 2008 (S.S.I. 2008 No. 228)
 The Local Government Pension Scheme (Transitional Provisions) (Scotland) Regulations 2008 (S.S.I. 2008 No. 229)
 The Local Government Pension Scheme (Benefits, Membership and Contributions) (Scotland) Regulations 2008 (S.S.I. 2008 No. 230)
 The A77 Trunk Road (Park End to Bennane Improvement) (Side Roads) Order 2008 (S.S.I. 2008 No. 231)
 The Offenders Assisting Investigations and Prosecutions (Substituted Sentences) (Scotland) Order 2008 (S.S.I. 2008 No. 232)
 The Rural Development Contracts (Rural Priorities) (Scotland) Amendment Regulations 2008 (S.S.I. 2008 No. 233)
 The Bluetongue (Scotland) Amendment Order 2008 (S.S.I. 2008 No. 234)
 The Graduate Endowment (Scotland) Regulations 2008 (S.S.I. 2008 No. 235)
 The Court of Session etc. Fees Amendment Order 2008 (S.S.I. 2008 No. 236)
 The High Court of Justiciary Fees Amendment Order 2008 (S.S.I. 2008 No. 237)
 The Adults with Incapacity (Public Guardian’s Fees) (Scotland) Amendment Regulations 2008 (S.S.I. 2008 No. 238)
 The Sheriff Court Fees Amendment Order 2008 (S.S.I. 2008 No. 239)
 The Criminal Legal Assistance (Fees and Information etc.) (Scotland) Regulations 2008 (S.S.I. 2008 No. 240)
 The Fundable Bodies (The Scottish Agricultural College) (Scotland) Order 2008 (S.S.I. 2008 No. 241)
 The A90 Trunk Road (Glendoick) (Temporary Prohibition of Specified Turns) Order 2008 (S.S.I. 2008 No. 242)
 The Roads (Scotland) Act 1984 (Fixed Penalty) Regulations 2008 (S.S.I. 2008 No. 243)
 The Road Works (Fixed Penalty) (Scotland) Regulations 2008 (S.S.I. 2008 No. 244)
 The Glasgow Commonwealth Games Act 2008 (Commencement No. 1) Order 2008 (S.S.I. 2008 No. 245 (C. 21))
 The Electricity Works (Environmental Impact Assessment) (Scotland) Amendment Regulations 2008 (S.S.I. 2008 No. 246)
 The Mobility and Access Committee for Scotland Revocation Regulations 2008 Revocation Regulations 2008 (S.S.I. 2008 No. 247)
 The Public Transport Users' Committee for Scotland Amendment Order 2008 Revocation Order 2008 (S.S.I. 2008 No. 248)
 The A737/A738 Trunk Road (Park Lane, Old Woodwynd Road, The Meadows, Claremont Crescent, Kilwinning) (Temporary Prohibition of Specified Turns) Order 2008 (S.S.I. 2008 No. 249)
 The A977 Trunk Road (Kincardine) (30 mph and 40 mph Speed Limit) Order 2008 (S.S.I. 2008 No. 250)
 The Advice and Assistance (Limits, Conditions and Representation) (Scotland) Regulations 2008 (S.S.I. 2008 No. 251)
 The A9 Trunk Road (Aberuthven to Loaninghead) (Temporary Prohibition of Specified Turns) Order 2008 (S.S.I. 2008 No. 252)
 The Public Service Vehicles (Registration of Local Services) (Scotland) Amendment Regulations 2008 (S.S.I. 2008 No. 253)
 The M77/A77 Trunk Road (Bogend Toll) (Temporary Prohibition of Specified Turns) Order 2008 (S.S.I. 2008 No. 254)
 The South West Unit Trunk Roads Area (Temporary Prohibitions of Traffic, Temporary Prohibitions of Overtaking and Temporary Speed Restrictions) (No.6) Order 2008 (S.S.I. 2008 No. 255)
 The South East Unit Trunk Roads Area (Temporary Prohibitions of Traffic, Temporary Prohibitions of Overtaking and Temporary Speed Restrictions) (No.6) Order 2008 (S.S.I. 2008 No. 256)
 The North West Unit Trunk Roads Area (Temporary Prohibitions of Traffic, Temporary Prohibitions of Overtaking and Temporary Speed Restrictions) (No.6) Order 2008 (S.S.I. 2008 No. 257)
 The North East Unit Trunk Roads Area (Temporary Prohibitions of Traffic, Temporary Prohibitions of Overtaking and Temporary Speed Restrictions) (No.6) Order 2008 (S.S.I. 2008 No. 258)
 The Human Tissue (Scotland) Act 2006 (Consequential Amendment) Order 2008 (S.S.I. 2008 No. 259)
 The Protection of Children (Scotland) Act 2003 (Amendment of the Definition of Child Care Position) Order 2008 (S.S.I. 2008 No. 260)
 The Plastic Materials and Articles in Contact with Food (Scotland) Amendment Regulations 2008 (S.S.I. 2008 No. 261)
 The Further and Higher Education (Scotland) Act 1992 Modification Order 2008 (S.S.I. 2008 No. 262)
 The Water Environment (Relevant Enactments and Designation of Responsible Authorities and Functions) Order 2008 (S.S.I. 2008 No. 263)
 The Crime (International Co-operation) Act 2003 (Designation of Participating Countries) (Scotland) Order 2008 (S.S.I. 2008 No. 264)
 The Nutritional Requirements for Food and Drink in Schools (Scotland) Regulations 2008 (S.S.I. 2008 No. 265)
 The Control of Salmonella in Poultry (Scotland) Order 2008 (S.S.I. 2008 No. 266)
 The M90 Trunk Road (Gairneybridge to Milnathort) (Temporary 50 mph Speed Limit) Order 2008 (S.S.I. 2008 No. 267)
 The Charity Test (Specified Bodies) (Scotland) Order 2008 (S.S.I. 2008 No. 268)
 The Water Environment and Water Services (Scotland) Act 2003 (Commencement No. 8) Order 2008 (S.S.I. 2008 No. 269 (C. 22))
 The A737/A738 Trunk Road (Howgate, Kilwinning to Cockenzie Road, Dalvargen) (Temporary Width and Weight Restriction of Traffic) Order 2008 (S.S.I. 2008 No. 270)
 The A82 Trunk Road (Scottish Open Golf Tournament, Loch Lomond) (Special Event) (Temporary Restriction of Speed) Order 2008 (S.S.I. 2008 No. 271)
 The A92/A972 Trunk Road (Scott Fyffe Roundabout, Dundee to Pitkerro Roundabout, Dundee) (Temporary Prohibition of Specified Turns) Order 2008 (S.S.I. 2008 No. 272)
 The M90/A90 Trunk Road (Bruntland Road Junction, Portlethen) (Temporary Prohibition of Specified Turns) Order 2008 (S.S.I. 2008 No. 273)
 The A96 Trunk Road (Moss Street, Keith) (Temporary Prohibition of Specified Turns) Order 2008 (S.S.I. 2008 No. 274)
 Act of Adjournal (Criminal Procedure Rules Amendment No. 3) (Seizure and Disposal of Vehicles) 2008 (S.S.I. 2008 No. 275)
 The South West Unit Trunk Roads Area (Temporary Prohibitions of Traffic, Temporary Prohibitions of Overtaking and Temporary Speed Restrictions) (No.7) Order 2008 (S.S.I. 2008 No. 276)
 The North West Unit Trunk Roads Area (Temporary Prohibitions of Traffic, Temporary Prohibitions of Overtaking and Temporary Speed Restrictions) (No.7) Order 2008 (S.S.I. 2008 No. 277)
 The South East Unit Trunk Roads Area (Temporary Prohibitions of Traffic, Temporary Prohibitions of Overtaking and Temporary Speed Restrictions) (No.7) Order 2008 (S.S.I. 2008 No. 278)
 The North East Unit Trunk Roads Area (Temporary Prohibitions of Traffic, Temporary Prohibitions of Overtaking and Temporary Speed Restrictions) (No.7) Order 2008 (S.S.I. 2008 No. 279)
 The A84/A85 Trunk Road (Strathyre) (30 mph and 40 mph Speed Limits) Order 2008 (S.S.I. 2008 No. 280)
 The A90 Trunk Road (B957 Tannadice Junction) (Temporary Prohibition of Specified Turns) Order 2008 (S.S.I. 2008 No. 281)
 The Adoption and Children (Scotland) Act 2007 (Commencement No. 2) Order 2008 (S.S.I. 2008 No. 282 (C. 23))
 The Housing Grants (Application Forms) (Scotland) Amendment Regulations 2008 (S.S.I. 2008 No. 283)
 The South West Unit Trunk Roads Area (Temporary Prohibitions of Traffic, Temporary Prohibitions of Overtaking and Temporary Speed Restrictions) (No.8) Order 2008 (S.S.I. 2008 No. 284)
 The South East Unit Trunk Roads Area (Temporary Prohibitions of Traffic, Temporary Prohibitions of Overtaking and Temporary Speed Restrictions) (No.8) Order 2008 (S.S.I. 2008 No. 285)
 The North West Unit Trunk Roads Area (Temporary Prohibitions of Traffic, Temporary Prohibitions of Overtaking and Temporary Speed Restrictions) (No.8) Order 2008 (S.S.I. 2008 No. 286)
 The North East Unit Trunk Roads Area (Temporary Prohibitions of Traffic, Temporary Prohibitions of Overtaking and Temporary Speed Restrictions) (No.8) Order 2008 (S.S.I. 2008 No. 287)
 The National Health Service (Travelling Expenses and Remission of Charges) (Scotland) Amendment (No. 2) Regulations 2008 (S.S.I. 2008 No. 288)
 The National Health Service (Optical Charges and Payments) (Scotland) Amendment (No. 2) Regulations 2008 (S.S.I. 2008 No. 289)
 The National Health Service (Charges to Overseas Visitors) (Scotland) Amendment Regulations 2008 (S.S.I. 2008 No. 290)
 The Public Contracts and Utilities Contracts (Common Procurement Vocabulary Codes) Amendment (Scotland) Regulations 2008 (S.S.I. 2008 No. 291)
 The Licensing (Scotland) Act 2005 (Commencement No. 5) Order 2008 (S.S.I. 2008 No. 292 (C. 24))
 The Divorce etc. (Pensions) (Scotland) Amendment Regulations 2008 (S.S.I. 2008 No. 293)
 The Less Favoured Area Support Scheme (Scotland) Amendment Regulations 2008 (S.S.I. 2008 No. 294)
 The Smoke Control Areas (Authorised Fuels) (Scotland) (No. 2) Regulations 2008 (S.S.I. 2008 No. 295)
 The Smoke Control Areas (Exempt Fireplaces) (Scotland) (No. 2) Order 2008 (S.S.I. 2008 No. 296)
 The Freedom of Information (Scotland) Act 2002 (Scottish Public Authorities) Amendment Order 2008 (S.S.I. 2008 No. 297)
 The Action Programme for Nitrate Vulnerable Zones (Scotland) Regulations 2008 (S.S.I. 2008 No. 298)
 The Potatoes Originating in Poland (Notification) (Scotland) Amendment Order 2008 (S.S.I. 2008 No. 299)
 The Plant Health (Scotland) Amendment Order 2008 (S.S.I. 2008 No. 300)

301-400

 The M9/A9 Trunk Road (Olrig Street, Traill Street & Sir George’s Street, Thurso) (Prohibition of Waiting and Loading) Order 2008 (S.S.I. 2008 No. 301)
 The Dangerous Wild Animals Act 1976 (Modification) (Scotland) Order 2008 (S.S.I. 2008 No. 302)
 The Adoptions with a Foreign Element (Special Restrictions on Adoptions from Abroad) (Scotland) Regulations 2008 (S.S.I. 2008 No. 303)
 The Special Restrictions on Adoptions from Cambodia (Scotland) Order 2008 (S.S.I. 2008 No. 304)
 The Special Restrictions on Adoptions from Guatemala (Scotland) Order 2008 (S.S.I. 2008 No. 305)
 The Adult Support and Protection (Scotland) Act 2007 (Restriction on the Authorisation of Council Officers) Order 2008 (S.S.I. 2008 No. 306)
 The Restriction of Liberty Order (Scotland) Amendment Regulations 2008 (S.S.I. 2008 No. 307)
 The Housing (Scotland) Act 2006 (Commencement No. 6 and Transitional Provision) Order 2008 (S.S.I. 2008 No. 308 (C. 25))
 The Energy Performance of Buildings (Scotland) Regulations 2008 (S.S.I. 2008 No. 309)
 The Building (Scotland) Amendment Regulations 2008 (S.S.I. 2008 No. 310)
 The Legal Profession and Legal Aid (Scotland) Act 2007 (Commencement No. 5) Order 2008 (S.S.I. 2008 No. 311 (C. 26))
 The National Health Service (Functions of the Common Services Agency) (Scotland) Order 2008 (S.S.I. 2008 No. 312)
 The Homelessness etc. (Scotland) Act 2003 (Commencement No. 3) Order 2008 (S.S.I. 2008 No. 313 (C. 27))
 The Adult Support and Protection (Scotland) Act 2007 (Commencement No. 3 and Related Amendments) Order 2008 (S.S.I. 2008 No. 314 (C. 28))
 The National Health Service (Recognition of Health Service Bodies) (Scotland) Order 2008 (S.S.I. 2008 No. 315)
 The Mental Health (Certificates for Medical Treatment) (Scotland) Amendment Regulations 2008 (S.S.I. 2008 No. 316)
 The Inshore Fishing (Prohibition on Fishing) (Lamlash Bay) (Scotland) Order 2008 (S.S.I. 2008 No. 317)
 The South West Unit Trunk Roads Area (Temporary Prohibitions of Traffic, Temporary Prohibitions of Overtaking and Temporary Speed Restrictions) (No.9) Order 2008 (S.S.I. 2008 No. 318)
 The South East Unit Trunk Roads Area (Temporary Prohibitions of Traffic, Temporary Prohibitions of Overtaking and Temporary Speed Restrictions) (No.9) Order 2008 (S.S.I. 2008 No. 319)
 The North East Unit Trunk Roads Area (Temporary Prohibitions of Traffic, Temporary Prohibitions of Overtaking and Temporary Speed Restrictions) (No.9) Order 2008 (S.S.I. 2008 No. 320)
 The North West Unit Trunk Roads Area (Temporary Prohibitions of Traffic, Temporary Prohibitions of Overtaking and Temporary Speed Restrictions) (No.9) Order 2008 (S.S.I. 2008 No. 321)
 The Infant Formula and Follow-on Formula (Scotland) Amendment Regulations 2008 (S.S.I. 2008 No. 322)
 The A68 Trunk Road (Dalkeith Northern Bypass) (Temporary Prohibition of Traffic, Temporary Prohibition of Overtaking and Temporary Speed Restriction) Order 2008 (S.S.I. 2008 No. 323)
 The Notice to Local Authorities (Scotland) Regulations 2008 (S.S.I. 2008 No. 324)
 The Dumfries and Galloway (Electoral Arrangements) Amendment Order 2008 (S.S.I. 2008 No. 325)
 The Fish Farming Businesses (Record Keeping) (Scotland) Order 2008 (S.S.I. 2008 No. 326)
 The Bluetongue (Scotland) Amendment (No. 2) Order 2008 (S.S.I. 2008 No. 327)
 The Justice of the Peace Court (Sheriffdom of Glasgow and Strathkelvin) Order 2008 (S.S.I. 2008 No. 328)
 The Criminal Proceedings etc. (Reform) (Scotland) Act 2007 (Commencement No. 5) Order 2008 (S.S.I. 2008 No. 329 (C. 29))
 The Local Government Finance (Scotland) Order 2008 (S.S.I. 2008 No. 33)
 The Stipendiary Magistrates (Specified Day) (Sheriffdom of Glasgow and Strathkelvin) Order 2008 (S.S.I. 2008 No. 330)
 The Peterhead Port Authority Harbour Revision Order 2008 (S.S.I. 2008 No. 331)
 The Legal Profession and Legal Aid (Scotland) Act 2007 (Transitional, Savings and Consequential Provisions) Order 2008 (S.S.I. 2008 No. 332)
 The Mental Health (Absconding Patients from Other Jurisdictions) (Scotland) Regulations 2008 (S.S.I. 2008 No. 333)
 The Bankruptcy (Scotland) Amendment Regulations 2008 (S.S.I. 2008 No. 334)
 Act of Sederunt (Summary Applications, Statutory Applications and Appeals etc. Rules) Amendment (Adult Support and Protection (Scotland) Act 2007) (No.2) 2008 (S.S.I. 2008 No. 335)
 The Housing Grants (Assessment of Contributions) (Scotland) Amendment Regulations 2008 (S.S.I. 2008 No. 336)
 The A9 Trunk Road (Bankfoot Junction Improvement) (Side Roads) Order 2008 (S.S.I. 2008 No. 337)
 The A9 Trunk Road (Bankfoot Junction Improvement) (Slip Roads) Order 2008 (S.S.I. 2008 No. 338)
 The Freedom of Information (Relaxation of Statutory Prohibitions on Disclosure of Information) (Scotland) Order 2008 (S.S.I. 2008 No. 339)
 The A68 Trunk Road (Dalkeith Northern Bypass) (Temporary Prohibition of Traffic, Temporary Prohibition of Overtaking and Temporary Speed Restriction) (No.2) Order 2008 (S.S.I. 2008 No. 340)
 The A90 Trunk Road (North Anderson Drive, Aberdeen) (Prohibition of Specified Turns) Order 2008 (S.S.I. 2008 No. 341)
 The Pesticides (Maximum Residue Levels) (Scotland) Regulations 2008 (S.S.I. 2008 No. 342)
 The North East Unit Trunk Roads Area (Temporary Prohibitions of Traffic, Temporary Prohibitions of Overtaking and Temporary Speed Restrictions) (No.10) Order 2008 (S.S.I. 2008 No. 343)
 The North West Unit Trunk Roads Area (Temporary Prohibitions of Traffic, Temporary Prohibitions of Overtaking and Temporary Speed Restrictions) (No.10) Order 2008 (S.S.I. 2008 No. 344)
 The South East Unit Trunk Roads Area (Temporary Prohibitions of Traffic, Temporary Prohibitions of Overtaking and Temporary Speed Restrictions) (No. 10) Order 2008 (S.S.I. 2008 No. 345)
 The South West Unit Trunk Roads Area (Temporary Prohibitions of Traffic, Temporary Prohibitions of Overtaking and Temporary Speed Restrictions) (No.10) Order 2008 (S.S.I. 2008 No. 346)
 The A96 Trunk Road (Church Road, Keith) (Special Event) (Temporary Prohibition of Traffic) Order 2008 (S.S.I. 2008 No. 347)
 The Public Appointments and Public Bodies etc. (Scotland) Act 2003 (Amendment of Specified Authorities) Order 2008 (S.S.I. 2008 No. 348)
 Act of Sederunt (Rules of the Court of Session Amendment No. 5) (Miscellaneous) 2008 (S.S.I. 2008 No. 349)
 The Plant Health (Scotland) Amendment (No. 2) Order 2008 (S.S.I. 2008 No. 350)
 The M90/A90 Trunk Road (Powrie Brae) (Temporary Prohibition of Specified Turns) Order 2008 (S.S.I. 2008 No. 351)
 The Legal Profession and Legal Aid (Scotland) Act 2007 (Abolition of the Scottish legal services ombudsman) Order 2008 (S.S.I. 2008 No. 352)
 The A82 Trunk Road (Invermoriston to Fort Augustus, Portclair) (Temporary Prohibition of Traffic, Temporary Prohibition of Overtaking and Temporary Speed Restriction) Order 2008 (S.S.I. 2008 No. 353)
 The A68 Trunk Road (Station Bar, Jedburgh) (Temporary Width Restriction of Traffic) Order 2008 (S.S.I. 2008 No. 354)
 The Scottish Commission for Human Rights (Specification) Order 2008 (S.S.I. 2008 No. 355)
 The Mental Health (England and Wales Cross-border transfer: patients subject to requirements other than detention) (Scotland) Regulations 2008 (S.S.I. 2008 No. 356)
 Act of Sederunt (Transfer of Judicial Review Applications from the Court of Session) 2008 (S.S.I. 2008 No. 357)
 The National Health Service Central Register (Scotland) Amendment Regulations 2008 (S.S.I. 2008 No. 358)
 The Business Improvement Districts (Scotland) Amendment Regulations 2008 (S.S.I. 2008 No. 359)
 The Valuation for Rating (Plant and Machinery) (Scotland) Amendment Regulations 2008 (S.S.I. 2008 No. 360)
 The Whiteness Marina Harbour Revision Order 2008 (S.S.I. 2008 No. 361)
 The Criminal Proceedings etc. (Reform) (Scotland) Act 2007 (Commencement No. 6) Order 2008 (S.S.I. 2008 No. 362 (C. 30))
 The Justice of the Peace Courts (Sheriffdom of Tayside, Central and Fife) Order 2008 (S.S.I. 2008 No. 363)
 The A68 Trunk Road (Pathhead) (30 mph Speed Limit) Order 2008 (S.S.I. 2008 No. 364)
 Act of Sederunt (Sheriff Court Rules) (Miscellaneous Amendments) (No. 2) 2008 (S.S.I. 2008 No. 365)
 Act of Sederunt (Fees of Messengers-at-Arms) (EC Service Regulation) 2008 (S.S.I. 2008 No. 366)
 The A68 Trunk Road (Dalkeith) (30 mph Speed Limit and St David’s Primary School part-time 20 mph Speed Limit) Order 2008 (S.S.I. 2008 No. 367)
 The Sheep and Goats (Identification and Traceability) (Scotland) Amendment Regulations 2008 (S.S.I. 2008 No. 368)
 The Pigs (Records, Identification and Movement) Amendment (Scotland) Order 2008 (S.S.I. 2008 No. 369)
 The Non-Domestic Rating (Rural Areas and Rateable Value Limits) (Scotland) Amendment Order 2008 (S.S.I. 2008 No. 370)
 The Non-Domestic Rating (Rural Areas and Rateable Value Limits) (Scotland) Amendment Order 2009 Amendment Order 2008 (S.S.I. 2008 No. 371)
 The European Communities (Service of Judicial and Extrajudicial Documents) (Scotland) Amendment Regulations 2008 (S.S.I. 2008 No. 372)
 The A96 Trunk Road (Moss Street, Keith) (Prohibition of Waiting and Loading ) Order 2008 (S.S.I. 2008 No. 373)
 The Justice of the Peace Court (Sheriffdom of Glasgow and Strathkelvin) Amendment Order 2008 (S.S.I. 2008 No. 374)
 Act of Sederunt (Summary Applications, Statutory Applications and Appeals etc. Rules) Amendment (Adult Support and Protection (Scotland) Act 2007) (No. 3) 2008 (S.S.I. 2008 No. 375)
 The Public Contracts and Utilities Contracts (Postal Services and Common Procurement Vocabulary Codes) Amendment (Scotland) Regulations 2008 (S.S.I. 2008 No. 376)
 The Prisons and Young Offenders Institutions (Scotland) Amendment Rules 2008 (S.S.I. 2008 No. 377)
 The Zoonoses and Animal By-Products (Fees) (Scotland) Amendment Regulations 2008 (S.S.I. 2008 No. 378)
 The Sports Grounds and Sporting Events (Designation) (Scotland) Amendment Order 2008 (S.S.I. 2008 No. 379)
 The Adults with Incapacity (Electronic Communications) (Scotland) Order 2008 (S.S.I. 2008 No. 380)
 The A830 Trunk Road (Arisaig to Loch nan Uamh Improvement) (Temporary Prohibition of Traffic, Temporary Prohibition of Overtaking and Temporary Speed Restriction) Order 2008 (S.S.I. 2008 No. 381)
 The South West Unit Trunk Roads Area (Temporary Prohibitions of Traffic, Temporary Prohibitions of Overtaking and Temporary Speed Restrictions) (No.11) Order 2008 (S.S.I. 2008 No. 382)
 The South East Unit Trunk Roads Area (Temporary Prohibitions of Traffic, Temporary Prohibitions of Overtaking and Temporary Speed Restrictions) (No.11) Order 2008 (S.S.I. 2008 No. 383)
 The North West Unit Trunk Roads Area (Temporary Prohibitions of Traffic, Temporary Prohibitions of Overtaking and Temporary Speed Restrictions) (No.11) Order 2008 (S.S.I. 2008 No. 384)
 The North East Unit Trunk Roads Area (Temporary Prohibitions of Traffic, Temporary Prohibitions of Overtaking and Temporary Speed Restrictions) (No.11) Order 2008 (S.S.I. 2008 No. 385)
 The Book of Scottish Connections Regulations 2008 (S.S.I. 2008 No. 386)
 The Police Pensions (Amendment) (Scotland) Regulations 2008 (S.S.I. 2008 No. 387)
 The Edinburgh Napier University Order of Council 2008 (S.S.I. 2008 No. 388)
 The Energy Performance of Buildings (Scotland) Amendment Regulations 2008 (S.S.I. 2008 No. 389)
 The National Health Service (Travelling Expenses and Remission of Charges) (Scotland) Amendment (No. 3) Regulations 2008 (S.S.I. 2008 No. 390)
 The Title Conditions (Scotland) Act 2003 (Rural Housing Bodies) Amendment Order 2008 (S.S.I. 2008 No. 391)
 The A77 Trunk Road (Dalrymple Street, Girvan) (Special Event) (Temporary Prohibition of Traffic) Order 2008 (S.S.I. 2008 No. 392)
 The Insolvency (Scotland) Rules 1986 Amendment Rules 2008 (S.S.I. 2008 No. 393)
 The Action Programme for Nitrate Vulnerable Zones (Scotland) Amendment Regulations 2008 (S.S.I. 2008 No. 394)
 The Eggs and Chicks (Scotland) (No. 2) Regulations 2008 (S.S.I. 2008 No. 395)
 The Mental Health Tribunal for Scotland (Practice and Procedure) (No. 2) Amendment Rules 2008 (S.S.I. 2008 No. 396)
 The Building (Fees) (Scotland) Amendment Regulations 2008 (S.S.I. 2008 No. 397)
 The A82 Trunk Road (Ballachulish) (50 mph Speed Limit) Order 2008 (S.S.I. 2008 No. 398)
 The Pre-release Access to Official Statistics (Scotland) Order 2008 (S.S.I. 2008 No. 399)
 The Provision of School Lunches (Disapplication of the Requirement to Charge) (Scotland) Order 2008 (S.S.I. 2008 No. 400)

401-441

 Act of Sederunt (Rules of the Court of Session Amendment No. 6) (Counter-Terrorism Act 2008) 2008 (S.S.I. 2008 No. 401)
 The Private Landlord Registration (Advice and Assistance) (Scotland) Amendment Regulations 2008 (S.S.I. 2008 No. 402)
 The Private Landlord Registration (Information and Fees) (Scotland) Amendment Regulations 2008 (S.S.I. 2008 No. 403)
 The Law Applicable to Non-Contractual Obligations (Scotland) Regulations 2008 (S.S.I. 2008 No. 404)
 The Local Electoral Administration and Registration Services (Scotland) Act 2006 (Commencement No. 4) Order 2008 (S.S.I. 2008 No. 405 (C. 31))
 The Housing (Scotland) Act 2006 (Scheme of Assistance) Regulations 2008 (S.S.I. 2008 No. 406)
 The A85 Trunk Road (Dalmally) (40 mph Speed Limit) Order 2008 (S.S.I. 2008 No. 407)
 The A76 Trunk Road (Glenairlie Improvement) (Temporary Prohibition of Traffic, Temporary Prohibition of Overtaking and Temporary Speed Restriction) Order 2008 (S.S.I. 2008 No. 408)
 The M9/A9 Trunk Road (Field Accesses North of the B934 Junction, Perthshire) (Prohibition of Specified Turns) Order 2008 (S.S.I. 2008 No. 409)
 The Pollution Prevention and Control (Scotland) Amendment Regulations 2008 (S.S.I. 2008 No. 410)
 The Planning etc. (Scotland) Act 2006 (Commencement No. 5) Order 2008 (S.S.I. 2008 No. 411 (C. 32))
 The Fundable Bodies (Scotland) Order 2008 (S.S.I. 2008 No. 412)
 The Protection of Charities Assets (Exemption) and the Charity Test (Specified Bodies) (Scotland) Amendment Order 2008 (S.S.I. 2008 No. 413)
 The Local Government (Allowances and Expenses) (Scotland) Amendment Regulations 2008 (S.S.I. 2008 No. 414)
 The Local Governance (Scotland) Act 2004 (Remuneration) Amendment Regulations 2008 (S.S.I. 2008 No. 415)
 The Assistance by Way of Representation (District Court Financial Limit) (Scotland) Order 2008 (S.S.I. 2008 No. 416)
 The Transmissible Spongiform Encephalopathies (Scotland) Amendment (No. 2) Regulations 2008 (S.S.I. 2008 No. 417)
 The Beef and Veal Labelling (Scotland) Regulations 2008 (S.S.I. 2008 No. 418)
 The Freshwater Fish Conservation (Prohibition on Fishing for Eels) (Scotland) Regulations 2008 (S.S.I. 2008 No. 419)
 The A702 Trunk Road (Biggar High Street, Biggar) (Special Event) (Temporary Prohibition of Traffic) Order 2008 (S.S.I. 2008 No. 420)
 The A7 Trunk Road (Auchenrivock Improvement) (Temporary Prohibition of Traffic, Temporary Prohibition of Overtaking and Temporary Speed Restriction) Order 2008 (S.S.I. 2008 No. 421)
 The Stornoway Harbour Revision (Constitution) Order 2008 (S.S.I. 2008 No. 422)
 The Zoonoses and Animal By-Products (Fees) (Scotland) Amendment (No. 2) Regulations 2008 (S.S.I. 2008 No. 423)
 The Budget (Scotland) Act 2008 Amendment Order 2008 (S.S.I. 2008 No. 424)
 The Conservation (Natural Habitats, &c.) Amendment (No. 2) (Scotland) Regulations 2008 (S.S.I. 2008 No. 425)
 The Town and Country Planning (Development Planning) (Scotland) Regulations 2008 (S.S.I. 2008 No. 426)
 The Planning etc. (Scotland) Act 2006 (Development Planning) (Saving, Transitional and Consequential Provisions) Order 2008 (S.S.I. 2008 No. 427)
 The Legal Profession and Legal Aid (Scotland) Act 2007 (Handling Complaints and Specification of Interest Rates) Order 2008 (S.S.I. 2008 No. 428)
 The Scottish Water (Loch of Boardhouse) Water Order 2008 (S.S.I. 2008 No. 429)
 Act of Sederunt (Fees of Sheriff Officers) 2008 (S.S.I. 2008 No. 430)
 Act of Sederunt (Fees of Messengers-at-Arms) 2008 (S.S.I. 2008 No. 431)
 The Town and Country Planning (Development Management Procedure) (Scotland) Regulations 2008 (S.S.I. 2008 No. 432)
 The Town and Country Planning (Schemes of Delegation and Local Review Procedure) (Scotland) Regulations 2008 (S.S.I. 2008 No. 433)
 The Town and Country Planning (Appeals) (Scotland) Regulations 2008 (S.S.I. 2008 No. 434)
 Act of Sederunt (Sheriff Court European Small Claims Procedure Rules) 2008 (S.S.I. 2008 No. 435)
 Act of Sederunt (Sheriff Court European Order for Payment Procedure Rules) 2008 (S.S.I. 2008 No. 436)
 The North East Unit Trunk Roads Area (Temporary Prohibitions of Traffic, Temporary Prohibitions of Overtaking and Temporary Speed Restrictions) (No.12) Order 2008 (S.S.I. 2008 No. 437)
 The North West Unit Trunk Roads Area (Temporary Prohibitions of Traffic, Temporary Prohibitions of Overtaking and Temporary Speed Restrictions) (No.12) Order 2008 (S.S.I. 2008 No. 438)
 The South East Unit Trunk Roads Area (Temporary Prohibitions of Traffic, Temporary Prohibitions of Overtaking and Temporary Speed Restrictions) (No.12) Order 2008 (S.S.I. 2008 No. 439)
 The South West Unit Trunk Roads Area (Temporary Prohibitions of Traffic, Temporary Prohibitions of Overtaking and Temporary Speed Restrictions) (No.12) Order 2008 (S.S.I. 2008 No. 440)
 The M8 Motorway (Junction 21, Paisley Road) (Temporary Prohibition of Traffic) Order 2008 (S.S.I. 2008 No. 441)

External links
 Scottish Statutory Instrument List
 Scottish  Draft Statutory Instrument List

2008
2008 in Scotland
Scotland Statutory Instruments